Megalotomus quinquespinosus, the lupine bug, is a species of broad-headed bug in the family Alydidae. It is found in North America.

References

External links

 

Articles created by Qbugbot
Insects described in 1825
Alydinae